David Claude Smith Jr. (born August 10, 1952) is an American author of fantasy, horror, and suspense fiction, medical editor, and essayist. He writes as David C. Smith. He is best known for his heroic fantasy novels, including his collaborations with Richard L. Tierney featuring characters created by Robert E. Howard, notably six novels featuring Red Sonja. He is definitely very much still alive.

Life and family
Smith was born in Youngstown, Ohio, and since 1996 has lived in Palatine, Illinois, with his wife, Janine, and their daughter, Lily.

Career
Smith has written or co-written twenty-seven novels and numerous short stories. Aside from writing fiction, he has worked primarily as a medical editor.

Smith's collaborations with Tierney and some of his short fiction have been issued in German, and Oron has been translated into and reprinted in Czech.

Works

Novels

Oron and the Tales of Attluma
Oron is a barbaric warrior whom Smith introduces in the novel Oron (1978).   Oron and its prequels—Mosutha's Magic (1982), The Valley of Ogrum (1982), and The Ghost Army (1983)—as well as the novel The Sorcerer's Shadow (1978) and 26 short stories and novelettes (1971 to 2020) are set on the imaginary ancient island-continent Attluma. All five books are scheduled to be reprinted by Pulp Hero Press beginning in 2021.

Most of the Attluma short fiction appeared originally in fanzines and small-press publications during the 1970s and early 1980s. "Engor's Sword Arm" inspired the song "Sword Arm" by the Russian heavy metal band Blacksword..

Tales of Attluma (Pulp Hero Press, 2020) features 16 tales set in different periods of Attluma's history.

Sometime Lofty Towers (Pulp Hero Press, 2020) has been called “the literary artistic height that contemporary sword and sorcery can aspire to.” 

"Shadow of the Serpent" appears in Terra Incognita: Lost Worlds of Fantasy and Adventure (DMR Books, 2022); a tale of Akram, hero of The Sorcerer’s Shadow. 

A tour guide for all the Attluma stories published up to March 2021 is hosted by BlackGate.com to help readers understand the chronicles of tales versus publication dates (Aug 2020, edited in 2021 to include Sometime Lofty Towers).

Red Sonja and the Howard pastiches
Smith and Richard L. Tierney co-wrote six novels featuring the Hyrkanian warrior Red Sonja. The character, loosely based on Howard's Red Sonya, was adapted by Roy Thomas into stories for the Marvel line of Conan and Red Sonja comic magazines. The novels, all published by Ace Books, are The Ring of Ikribu (1981), Demon Night (1982), When Hell Laughs (1982), Endithor's Daughter (1982), Against the Prince of Hell (1983), and Star of Doom (1983).

Smith also wrote the novel The Witch of the Indies (1977), featuring the pirate Black Terence Vulmea, and co-wrote with Tierney For the Witch of the Mists (1978), featuring the Pictish warrior Bran Mak Morn. Both characters were created by Howard.

Other Fiction 
The Fall of the First World comprises The Master of Evil (manuscript title, The West Is Dying), Sorrowing Vengeance, and The Passing of the Gods. All were published by Pinnacle Books in 1983. The trilogy will be reprinted by Pulp Hero Press in 2021.

David Trevisan, a young sorcerer, appears in two novels, The Fair Rules of Evil (Avon Books, 1989) and The Eyes of Night (Avon Books, 1991).

The novel Seasons of the Moon, published by iUniverse in October 2005, features a rural matriarchal society.

Other novels include Call of Shadows (2009) Airship 27, Dark Muse (2012,  Damnation Press, reprinted 2019 by Pulp Hero Press), and Waters of Darkness (with Joe Bonadonna; 2013, Damnation Press, reprinted 2020 by Pulp Hero Press). The historical fiction novel Bright Star was published by Pulp Hero Press in 2019.

Nonfiction
In 2019, Smith was awarded the 2018 Atlantean Award for Outstanding Achievement, Book, by the Robert E. Howard Foundation for Robert E. Howard: A Literary Biography (Pulp Hero Press, 2018). His Guest of Honor acceptance speech, given at a Howard Days ceremony in Cross Plains, Texas, in June 2019, titled “Robert E. Howard: A Literary Reckoning,” is available on YouTube  (video by Ben Friberg) and appears in The Dark Man: The Journal of Robert E. Howard Literary Studies Vol. 10, No. 2, December 2019.

Articles written by Smith include "The Writer’s Style: Sound and Syntax in Howard’s Sentences" in The Dark Man: The Journal of Robert E. Howard Studies Vol. 5, No. 2, February 2013; "At the Crossroads: Swords, Sorcery, and Heavy Metal", in Metal & Fantasy, Vol. 1, Frantz-E. Petiteau, ed. (Rosiéres-en-Haye, France: Camion Blanc, 2014) [tr]; and "Introduction," in Swords of Steel, Dave Ritzlin, ed. (Chicago, Illinois: DMR Books , 2015).

Understanding English: How Sentences Work is a post-secondary English grammar textbook/workbook written by Smith and published by South-Western/ITC in 1991. His essays include "Fantasy in the Silent Cinema" and "A Critical Appreciation of John Milius's Conan the Barbarian".

References

External links
 The Dave Blog (blog.davidcsmith.net)

 
 Howard Days 2019 Guest of Honor David C. Smith (video by Ben Friberg)
 BlackGate.com's Tour Guide of the Oron/Attluma Series

Interviews
 Oliver Brackenbury's So I'm Writing a Novel Podcast; Ep 44 – Interview with David C. Smith (Part One)
 Interview with David C Smith, Parts 1 and 2 (podcast by Pete Pollack)      
 Of Swords and Scrolls: An Interview with Author David C. Smith          
 David C. Smith – The DMR Interview, Part One
 David C. Smith – The DMR Interview, Part Two

1952 births
20th-century American novelists
21st-century American novelists
American fantasy writers
American male novelists
Living people
Writers from Youngstown, Ohio
American male short story writers
20th-century American short story writers
21st-century American short story writers
20th-century American male writers
21st-century American male writers
Novelists from Ohio